The 2018 United States Senate election in Rhode Island took place on November 6, 2018, in order to elect a member of the United States Senate to represent the state of Rhode Island. Incumbent Democrat Sheldon Whitehouse was reelected to a third term, defeating Republican Robert Flanders by a margin of twenty-three percent.

Democratic primary

Candidates

Nominated
 Sheldon Whitehouse, incumbent Senator

Eliminated in primary
 Patty Joy Fontes, progressive activist

Declined
 Lincoln Chafee, former governor of Rhode Island and former U.S. Senator

Polling

Results

Republican primary

Candidates

Nominated
 Robert Flanders, former Associate Justice of the Rhode Island Supreme Court

Eliminated in primary
 Rocky De La Fuente, businessman and perennial candidate

Withdrew
 Robert Nardolillo, state representative

Endorsements

Results

General election

Debates
Complete video of debate, October 9, 2018

Predictions

Polling

with Robert Nardolillo

Results

References

External links
Candidates at Vote Smart
Candidates at Ballotpedia
Campaign finance at FEC
Campaign finance at OpenSecrets

Official campaign websites
Robert Flanders (R) for Senate
Sheldon Whitehouse (D) for Senate

2018
Rhode Island
United States Senate